Vagrant Soldier Ares (떠돌이 용병 아레스) is a Korean manhwa written and drawn by Ryu Kum-chel. The story centers on young swordsman Ares and takes place in a world similar to Ancient Rome. The manhwa is noted for its fluid action sequences and subtle anachronism.

Summary 
The world of Ares is similar to Ancient Rome and shares important names with that history. The protagonists belong to or ally with the central country of Chronos. Daraak and the Radnik Alliance flank Chronos' western border, Isiris flanks its southern border, Silonica flanks its eastern border, and the island nation of Minos is off its northern coast.

At the story's onset, Ares meets Mikael when both enlist with Temple Mercenaries, the most respected soldiers-for-hire in Chronos. Their comrades Baroona and Gohue are also soldiers for Temple Mercenaries.

Plot 

Ares and Mikael are admitted to the Chronos based Temple Mercenaries after a test of skill against B-rank soldiers. Both pass easily and find themselves assigned to the same unit. Baroona and Gohue join them. Ares and Mikael wield swords, Baroonaanother strong fighteruses two linked daggers, and the cowardly artist Gohue provides comic relief. Their first taste of combat together is saving Jagsen village from bandits. Mikael and Baroona impress the officers and are promoted to B rank. There Ares connects with a young boy named Mickey whose family was killed by the bandits.

Next the Temple Mercenaries are hired by Chronosian general Icarus for a pre-emptive attack against neighboring country Minos in conjunction with their ally, Silonica. There, the four meet Ariadne, Ares's future girlfriend, and her bodyguard Helena. During the invasion, Ares protects Ariadne, winning the respect of the initially antagonistic Helena. Mikael and Baroona attract the attention of Icarus when Mikael defeats General Kentaro, a champion of Minos.

The battle strategies of Icarus win against Minos, and he is sent to negotiate with the Radnik Alliance, a consortium of countries at Chronos' western border. Icarus knows he is being sent to his death while rivals plot wresting power from the weak King. His own troops are detained on other duties, and he must travel with different escort. Icarus does not trust the replacement troops, and he hires Mikael and Baroona as personal bodyguards. Mikael and Baroona recommend Ares and Gohue as well. The leader of the Radnik alliance has red eyes, similar to a dark figure in Ares' past, and Ares confronts him. They survive this encounter, retreat, and Mikael, Baroona, and Ares defeat an ambush staged by the traitorous replacement troops. After revealing his past, Mikael and Baroona promise to help Ares with the Red-Eyed Swordsman.

They return to the Chronosian capital to find Icarus declared dead and usurpers persecuting those loyal to the old king and Icarus. Icarus stops the civil war with notably minimal losses. He declines then accepts the offered kingship of Chronos and turns his attention to the Radnik Alliance. He wins against their greater numbers with greater strategy and the further commission of Temple Mercenaries. Ares and Mikael pursue and defeat the red-eyed leader but discover he is older brother to the man Ares seeksKirberos, the man who killed Ares' master. Kirberos shows himself but only to taunt Ares to make himself "worthy to kill".

Soon afterwards, Mikael receives word from his family, and he resigns from Temple Mercenaries to return home. Ares, Baroona and Gohue give their comrade a fond farewell. As Mikael leaves he is replaced by Robin, the mute archer who befriended the group during the Radnik campaign. 

Mikael is revealed to be the prince of rival country Isiris. With his father is on his deathbed, his uncle has started a coup. Mikael stops the coup, kills his uncle. Mikael then decides take over the world, with Chronos being the biggest obstacle. Mikael ruthlessly destroys the Temple Mercenaries' base killing the commander and the entire garrison, with the exception of Gohu and Ares. Robin, Baroona, and a handful of Temple Mercenaries return from a mission to find the destruction of their base. They, alongside Ares and Gohu rally to help assist King Icarus and the Chronosian army.

After a series of defeats and setbacks, Icarus fakes his death. He works in secret to form a united alliance of Silonica and members of the Radnik Alliance against Isiris. Mikael's forces suffers heavy losses due to over-dosing on the experimental drugs they use. Mikael quickly fills his ranks with raw recruits, mainly consisting of 10 year old youths with a week's worth of training. The newly united coalition eventually pushes the Isiris forces out of Chronos, when Icarus revealed himself. Mikael attempts to personally kill Icarus but is badly wounded by Robin, who disguised himself as an Isiris archer. Robin is immediately cut down and killed.

The coalition corners Mikael at his final stronghold. Ares is led to Mikael under the pretense of saving his girlfriend Ariadne, whom Mikael has kidnapped. As the two engage in a duel, it is revealed the Mikeal never kidnapped Ariadne. As the fight intensifies Mikeal suddenly lowers his guard allowing Ares to fatally wound him. Mikael tells Ares, that he never intended to kill Ares and wanted to die by his sword. Mikael states though initially, he had no regrets, he did regret choosing Ares to kill him. Mikael regretted the choice only after seeing Ares' crying face. After Mikael dies Ares, Baroona, and another surviving Temple Mercenary Douglas, defend Mikael's body from defilement and mutilation.

In a flashback it is seen Mikael went to great lengths to protect his friends. He constantly delayed his assault on the Temple Mercenary Base. He was hoping a mission would cause Ares, Gohu, Baroona, and Robin to leave the base, to keep them out of danger. When he found out only Robin and Baroona left, he had his best warrior secretly protect Ares, and trusted Gohu would find a good hiding spot. He also left his physician behind in disguise to nurse the two back to health. Mikael later sent out orders to capture Ares and Ariadne in order to remove them from the fighting and to keep them safe. In the present it is revealed that Mikael only kept three things in his personal treasury: his Temple Mercenary A rank helmet, his amulet, and a picture of him, Ares, and Baroona. Icarus and the remaining Temple Mercenaries are hailed as heroes, Ares in particular.

A year passes and Ares has left Ariadne and his friends without saying goodbye. He hunts Kirberos. Ares eventually finds him, and with the help of a disguised Baroona and the spirit of Mikael, Ares kills Kirberos. This fulfills the promise the three of them made, years prior. Ares and Baroona collect the reward money and return home. Ares reunites with Ariadne and together with Baroona and Gohu they rebuild the Temple Mercenaries. The story ends almost exactly as it began, with Mickey joining Commander Ares' reformed Temple Mercenaries.

Media

Manhwa 

The completed manhwa is 26 volumes originally published from 2001 to 2007 by Team Mania and BB Comics.

References 

Action-adventure comics
Manhwa titles
2001 comics debuts